This is a list of South African television related events from 2010.

Events
28 October - 45-year-old opera singer James Bhemgee wins the second season of SA's Got Talent.
2 November - Elvis Blue wins the sixth season of Idols South Africa.

Debuts

International
2 January -  Merlin (M-Net)
20 January - / Stargate Universe (M-Net Action)
13 May -  Southland (M-Net Action)
29 November -  Trauma (SABC3)
 Everything's Rosie (CBeebies)
 Babar and the Adventures of Badou (M-Net)

Changes of network affiliation

Television shows

1980s
Good Morning South Africa (1985–present)
Carte Blanche (1988–present)

1990s
Top Billing (1992–present)
Generations (1994–present)
Isidingo (1998–present)

2000s
Idols South Africa (2002–present)
Rhythm City (2007–present)
SA's Got Talent (2009–present)

Ending this year
Egoli: Place of Gold (1992-2010)

Births

Deaths

See also
2010 in South Africa